The Lavant Valley (or Laboška dolina; Southern Bavarian: Lovnthol) lies in the Lavanttal Alps in southern Austria in the eastern part of the state of Carinthia. It covers just under . Approximately 60,000 people live in the area.

Geography 
The Lavant River flows through the valley, having its source on the Zirbitzkogel in Styria and discharging into the Drau near Lavamünd. It is divided into the Upper Lavant Valley, which lies north of the Twimberger Graben, and the Lower Lavant Valley, which is further south. The lower, broader valley nestles between the mountains of the Koralpe and Saualpe. The Upper Lavant Valley lies between the Packalpe and the Seetal Alps.

The Lavant Valley forms the greater part of the administrative district of Wolfsberg.

Name 

It has its source in the border region between Styria and Carinthia, on the Styrian mountain of Zirbitzkogel. Near Lavamünd, in the southernmost part of the Lavant Valley, the Lavant empties into the Drau.

Climate 

The valley often suffers from temperature inversion during the winter half year, which brings fog and high levels of pollution in the valley bottom.

Agriculture 
The growing of maize and the rearing of pigs and chickens are the main forms of agriculture in the valley. In the Lower Lavant Valley and the adjacent Granitz Valley there are many orchards, especially of apples used to make cider and schnapps products. Here there are also several meadow orchards. Another speciality is asparagus.

Art and culture 

Well-known artistic personalities such as Christine Lavant, Switbert Lobisser, and Gerhart Ellert have done much to promote the culture of the valley. There are regular special exhibitions in the Benedictine monastery of St. Paul, which enhance the extensive art collections.

References

External links 
 Online publication Das Lavanttal
 Private collection about the Lavant Valley
 The Lavant Valley in the  Internet – Municipality of Lavanttal

Literature 

Bäk, Richard: "Geologie und Landschaftsbild des Kärntner Lavanttales", in: Schatzhaus Kärntens: Landesausstellung St. Paul 1991, 900 Jahre Benediktinerstift, Klagenfurt, 1991, Vol. 2, pp. 309 ff., 
Schober, Eduard: Das Lavanttal, Wolfsberg, 1990
Thelian, Werner und Richter, Nicole: Lust auf Lavanttal, Klagenfurt, 2007, 

Lavanttal Alps
Valleys of Carinthia (state)